The Swatch FIVB World Tour 2002 was the official international beach volleyball tour for 2002.

The USA won nine out of the 11 women's tournaments, but Brazil won six out of the ten men's tournaments.

Grand Slam
There were two Grand Slam tournaments. These events give a higher number of points and more money than the rest of the tournaments.

 Marseille, FranceWorld Series 13 Grand Slam, 16–21 July 2002
 Klagenfurt, AustriaA1 Grand Slam presented by Nokia, 31 July–4 August 2002

Schedule
Key

Tournament results

Women

Men

Rankings

Men

Women

References

2002 in beach volleyball
2002